Ghost Hunters International (abbreviated as GHI) is a spin-off series of Ghost Hunters that aired on Syfy (formerly Sci-Fi). The series premiered on January 9, 2008, and ended on April 4, 2012. Like its parent series, GHI was a reality series that followed a team of paranormal investigators; whereas the original series primarily covers only locations within the United States, the GHI team traveled around the world and documented some of the world's most legendary haunted locations.

Investigators

Final season cast (Season 3)
 Barry Fitzgerald – Co-lead investigator
 Kris Williams – Co-lead investigator (moved from Ghost Hunters; 2008–2012)
 Paul Bradford – Tech manager (2009–2012)
 Joe Chin – Investigator (moved from Ghost Hunters; 2008–2012)
 Susan Slaughter – Case manager (2010–2012)
 Scott Tepperman – Investigator (2010–2012)

Previous cast
 Robb Demarest – Co-lead investigator (2008–2010)
 Brandy Green – Case manager/investigator (2008–2010)
 Dustin Pari – Investigator (moved from Ghost Hunters; 2008–2010)
 Andy Andrews – Co-lead investigator (moved from Ghost Hunters; 2008–2009)
 Brian Harnois – Tech manager (moved from Ghost Hunters; 2008–2009)
 Donna La Croix – Case manager (moved from Ghost Hunters; 2008–2009)
 Shannon Sylvia – Investigator (2008–2009)
 Angela Alderman – Investigator (2008–2009)
 Ashley Godwin – Investigator (2009–2010)

Guests
 Josh Gates – Destination Truth lead investigator, Ghost Hunters live specials host
 Grant Wilson – Ghost Hunters co-lead investigator
 Jason Hawes – Ghost Hunters co-lead investigator
 Britt Griffith – Ghost Hunters investigator
 Karl Pfeiffer – Ghost Hunters Academy investigator-in-training
 Robert Hernandez – Investigator (2008–2009)
 Paul Winters – Investigator (2008–2009)
 MJ Wayland – Ghost Historian (2009–2010) – "The Spirit of Robin Hood"

Series overview

Episodes

Home media
 Ghost Hunters International — Complete First Season
 Ghost Hunters International — Season 1, Part 1 – (June 1, 2010)
 Ghost Hunters International — Season 1, Part 2 – (August 24, 2010)
 Ghost Hunters International — Season 2, Part 1 – (March 13, 2012)
 Ghost Hunters International — Season 2, Part 2 – (May 22, 2012)
 Ghost Hunters International — The Final Season – (August 27, 2013)

See also
 Ghost Hunters
 Ghost hunting
 Image Entertainment
 List of ghost films
 List of reportedly haunted locations in the world
 Paranormal television
 The Atlantic Paranormal Society (TAPS)

References

External links
 
 
 
 

American television spin-offs